The men's 300 m rifle three positions was one of 15 events on the shooting at the 1908 Summer Olympics programme. The competition was held on Saturday, 11 July 1908. Each nation could enter up to 12 shooters. Fifty-one sport shooters from ten nations competed. The event was won by Albert Helgerud of Norway, the nation's first victory in the event (after a bronze in 1900). Norway also won bronze, with Ole Sæther finishing third. Between the two Norwegians was Harry Simon, taking silver in the United States' debut.

Background

This was the second appearance of the men's 300 metre three-positions rifle event, which was held 11 times between 1900 and 1972. Lars Jørgen Madsen of Denmark, who had taken fifth in 1900, was competing again. None of the world champions competed.

Finland, Great Britain, Hungary, Sweden, and the United States made their debut in the event. Belgium, Denmark, France, the Netherlands, and Norway each made their second appearance.

Competition format

The competition had each shooter fire 120 shots, 40 shots in each of three positions: prone, kneeling, and standing. The target was 1 metre in diameter, with 10 scoring rings; targets were set at a distance of 300 metres. Thus, the maximum score possible was 1200 points. Any rifle could be used, with an open fore sight and any kind of back sight; any ammunition not "of a dangerous character" could be used. Uninterrupted strings of 10 shots were fired. Unlike in the last Games the event was contested, there were no medals for the individual positions; further, the team event was separated from the individual competition.

Records

Prior to the competition, the existing world and Olympic records were as follows.

No new world or Olympic records were set during the competition.

Schedule

Results

Each shooter fired 120 shots at the target 300 metres distant. Forty shots were fired from each of three positions—standing, kneeling, and prone. Each hit could score between 1 and 10 points, with the highest possible score being 1200 points.

References

External links
 
 

Men's rifle free 0300 metre
Men's 300m 3 positions